Enderal: The Shards of Order is a total conversion mod of Bethesda Softworks' The Elder Scrolls V: Skyrim developed by SureAI as a sequel to Nehrim: At Fate's Edge. It was released in July 2016, initially in German only. An English version was released August 16, 2016. An expansion, Forgotten Stories, was released on February 14, 2019.

Plot
The protagonist is introduced as a refugee attempting to escape to Enderal, a land of relative stability, on a merchant vessel. They are discovered towards the end of the voyage, causing their companion to be killed and resulting in the player being cast overboard. The player wakes up on the coast, discovers that they now possess magical powers, and travels to Ark, the capital of Enderal, to learn how to control these new abilities. It becomes clear that the player is a "Prophet", an individual of intense magical ability who can see into the past, and that your arrival coincides with "the Cleansing", a cycle of apocalyptic destruction and rebirth that has occurred for an indefinite amount of time. The cycle has recently begun anew following the death of the "Lightborn", part of a race of beings treated as gods by the inhabitants of the world. The death of the Lightborn has caused mass unrest in every nation, making the world seemingly ripe for the Cleansing, but the rulers of Enderal have managed to hide the truth from their subjects and escaped the turmoil. Throughout your journey, you uncover remnants of previous civilizations and assemble a magical beacon that supposedly offers the power to break the cycle of the Cleansing. Upon assembly, the player learns that a method for targeting the instigators of the Cleansing is needed, and a journey to the capital and epicenter of the civilization that came before Enderal is needed to achieve this. This journey reveals a plot twist: the game's antagonist has secretly manipulated events to ensure that the beacon would be constructed, because in truth, the beacon is the Cleansing. The player is forced to make a choice of either fleeing and leaving Enderal to be destroyed along with the rest of the world, or working to ensure that only Enderal is destroyed by the Cleansing, with the expansion adding a way to survive.

Development

Enderal was in development for five years by a team of fourteen. It requires the base Skyrim game but not its downloadable content. The mod is fully voiced in both German and English languages.

In December 2016, SureAI announced that Enderal would be getting an expansion pack, Forgotten Stories, to be released in 2017. Forgotten Stories features content that was cut from the original release, and is expected to add 10-20 hours of gameplay. This includes two questlines for guilds featured in the original mod, as well as a new secret ending to the main quest.

In December 2020, project lead and writer Nicolas Lietzau published his debut novel "Dreams of the Dying", the first book of a trilogy that expands the Enderal universe and explores the mercenary past of Jespar Dal'Varek, one of Enderal'''s main characters.

Reception
In his review at PC Gamer, Jody Macgregor awarded Enderal'' a score of 74/100. Macgregor found his 50+ hours spent in game enjoyable, rekindling the joy of discovery found in the base game. He appreciated the game's high standard of writing, and described the voice-acting as "far beyond what you expect from a fan project".

See also 

 Skyrim mods

References

External links
Enderal official website

2016 video games
Action role-playing video games
Role-playing video games
The Elder Scrolls mods
Video games developed in Germany
Windows-only games
Windows games